Nizhniye Kargaly (Tübänge Qarğalı) is a rural locality (a village) in Kargalinsky Selsoviet, Blagovarsky District, Bashkortostan, Russia. The population was 179 as of 2010. There is 1 street.

Geography 
Nizhniye Kargaly is located 27 km southwest of Yazykovo (the district's administrative centre) by road. Verkhniye Kargaly is the nearest rural locality.

References 

Rural localities in Blagovarsky District